Adult-onset immunodeficiency syndrome is a provisional name for an immunodeficiency illness. The name is proposed in the first public study to identify the syndrome. It appears to be chronic and non-contagious, affecting mainly people of Asian descent aged around 50. Cases first started appearing in 2004, primarily in Thailand and Taiwan.

Signs and symptoms 

At least one physician associates the symptoms with tuberculosis. Some lethal overwhelming infections are reported, aggravating people who already suffer other conditions such as HIV/AIDS. Clinical manifestations can involve symptoms similar to Generalized pustular psoriasis.

Cause 

Little is publicly known about the underlying factors causing the disease. Genetic factors are suspected, but the disease does not appear to be heritable. One specific gene hypothesized to be involved in the disorder is SERPINA1. Also, something in the environment may trigger the disease.

Mechanism 

An elevated concentration of autoantibodies that block interferon-gamma was detected in most patients.

Diagnosis

Treatment

Society and culture 

The swash.com website uses AIDS 2.0 as the moniker for maybe another, apparently highly contagious AIDS-like condition described by The Epoch Times.

The Daily Beast has described this disease emphatically as not AIDS 2.0.

References

External links 

Immunodeficiency
Syndromes affecting immunity
Health in Thailand